Alfred-Isaac Pereire  (30 January 1879, Paris – 28 November 1957, Paris, aged 78) was a 20th-century French historian and bibliographer.

Biography 
Ths son of Gustave Pereire and grandson of Isaac Pereire, he was conscripted during the First World War from 1914 to 1918.

He was the founder and general secretary of the Société des amis de la Bibliothèque nationale de France and organized several exhibitions at the Bibliothèque nationale.

 Publications (selection) 
1906: Des Premiers rapports entre Saint-Simon et Auguste Comte : d'après des documents originaux (1817-1819) 
1912: Autour de Saint-Simon : documents originaux : Saint-Simon, Auguste Comte et les deux lettres dites "anonymes". Saint-Simon et l'Entente cordiale. Un secrétaire inconnu de Saint-Simon. Saint-Simon et les frères Péreire 
1933: Un florilège des beaux livres français  
1934: A propos d'une édition originale rarissime de Ronsard1937: Vie de Pie XI1949: L'universalité de l'art Sources 
 Henri Temerson, Biographies des principales personnalités françaises décédées au cours de l'année'', Hachette, 1958
 Régis Tettamanzi, Esthétique de l'outrance: Annexes, 1999

External links 
 Alfred Pereire on data.bnf.fr

1879 births
Writers from Paris
1967 deaths
French bibliographers
20th-century French historians
Chevaliers of the Légion d'honneur
Pereire family